Alexander Narolin (Russian: Александр Владимирович Наролин; born 27 June 1972) is a Russian politician, who serves as a Russian Federation Senator from Adygea since 2021.

Biography

Alexander Narolin was born on 27 June 1972 in Krasnogvardeyskoye, Adygea. In 1994, he graduated from the Kuban State Agrarian University. 

After the graduation, he began working at the regional branch of the Russian Social Insurance Fund in Adygea. 

From 2008 to 2013, he was the Head of the Interdistrict Inspectorate of the Federal Taxation Service (No. 3, responsible for Adygea).

From 2013 to 2017, Narolin served as the Mayor of the Maykop, the republic's capital. 

He left the position in 2017 to take on the position of Prime Minister of Adygea. 

In December 2021, he was appointed as his region's representative in the Russian Federation Council by the Head of the Republic. As Senator, he effectively voted to recognise the independence of the Donetsk and Lugansk people's republics from Ukraine. As a result, he was sanctioned by the United States, Canada, United Kingdom, European Union, Switzerland, Australia and New Zealand.

References

Living people
1972 births
United Russia politicians
21st-century Russian politicians
Members of the Federation Council of Russia (after 2000)